Leif Sigurd Solheim (born July 14, 1932) is a Norwegian ice hockey player. He played for the Norwegian national ice hockey team, and  participated at the Winter Olympics in 1952. He was awarded Gullpucken as best Norwegian ice hockey player in 1959.
He is a brother of Olympian ice hockey player Øivind Solheim.

References

1932 births
Living people
Furuset Ishockey players
Ice hockey players at the 1952 Winter Olympics
Norwegian ice hockey players
Olympic ice hockey players of Norway
Ice hockey people from Oslo